Lim Kean Chye (born 22 December 1919) is a Malaysian former politician and lawyer.

Biography 
Lim is the son of Lim Cheng Ean, a Cambridge-trained lawyer and a legislative councillor in the 1930s, and the grandson of Phuah Hin Leong. Lim has a brother and sister, Lim Phaik Gan.

Lim was a founder member of the Malayan Democratic Union, which was formed on 21 December 1945. MDU was Singapore's first political party, and consisted of English educated Malaysians whose main objective was the assertion of the right to self-governance.

Upon returning to Malaya after completing his law degree from Cambridge University, Lim was contacted by Eu Chooi Yip and P V Sarma in August 1949 to join the Anti-British League (ABL), which he did. He would later be mentor to John Eber in the ABL. In January 1951, Lim escaped arrest and detention without trial when he went to China.

Lim was called to the Singapore Bar in 1950, and the Malayan Bar in 1961.

Lim lives in Penang and turned 100 in December 2019.

References

External links
http://3rdyounglawyersconvention2008.wordpress.com/2008/01/26/special-luncheon-talk-by-lim-kean-chye/
https://web.archive.org/web/20090525130934/http://www.aliran.com/oldsite/monthly/2002/11e.html
http://allmalaysia.info/news/story.asp?file=/2005/8/26/state/11770052&sec=mi_penang

1919 births
Living people
Malaysian centenarians
Malaysian people of Chinese descent
Men centenarians
20th-century Singaporean lawyers
Alumni of the University of Cambridge
Malaysian expatriates in the United Kingdom
People from Penang